Emily Greenwood is Professor of the Classics and of Comparative Literature at Harvard University. She was formerly professor of Classics and the University Center for Human Values at Princeton University and John M. Musser Professor of Classics and Chair of the Department of Classics at Yale University. Her research focuses on Ancient Greek historiography, particularly Thucydides and Herodotus, the development of History as a genre and a modern critical discipline, and local and transnational black traditions of interpreting Greek and Roman classics. Her work explores the appropriation and reinvention of Greco-Roman classical antiquity from the late nineteenth century to the present.

Early life and education 
Greenwood has been described as "half-British, half-Ugandan, and she was born in the Cayman Islands".

Greenwood won a merit scholarship to a boarding school, Sevenoaks School. She gained her BA, MPhil, and PhD in Classics at the University of Cambridge. Her PhD thesis, completed in 2001 and supervised by Professor Paul Cartledge was entitled The Invention of the Critic. The Writer as Critic from Herodotus to Aristotle.

Career 
Greenwood held a junior research fellowship at St Catharine's College, Cambridge, from 2000 until 2002. She was a lecturer in Greek at the University of St Andrews from 2002 to 2008, and joined the Classics Department at Yale in 2009, where she is Professor of Classics. She was appointed as John M. Musser Professor of Classics in October 2020.

She received the Runciman Award in 2011 for her book Afro-Greeks: Dialogues Between Anglophone Caribbean Literature and Classics in the 20th Century (Oxford University Press, 2010).

Greenwood gave the Yale College Keynote Address on 29 August 2017 with the talk "The University we Build". In 2018 she gave the Clack lecture at the Classical Association of the Atlantic States annual meeting, "Speaking Bones: Classical Philology in Black Experimental Writing". At the same conference, a panel was organised in honour of her work. In 2019 she gave the inaugural lecture of the University of Texas at Austin Distinguished Visiting Lecture Series, “Narrative and Social Justice", speaking on “Philology and Reparation: Resisting Anti-Human Errors in ‘Great’ Books”. She is a general editor of the Cambridge University Press series 'Classics after Antiquity'.

In 2022 Greenwood was hired by Harvard in a joint professorship between the Department of Comparative Literature and Department of the Classics.

Bibliography

Monographs 

Thucydides and the Shaping of History (London: Duckworth, 2006)
Homer in the Twentieth Century: Between World Literature and the Western Canon, ed. with Barbara Graziosi (Oxford: Oxford University Press, 2007)
Reading Herodotus: A Study of the Logoi in Book 5 of Herodotus’ Histories, ed. with Elizabeth Irwin (Cambridge: Cambridge University Press, 2007)
Afro-Greeks: Dialogues Between Anglophone Caribbean Literature and Classics in the Twentieth Century (Cambridge: Cambridge University Press, 2010)
Classics: A Beginner's Guide (Oneworld Publications, forthcoming 2020)

Articles and book chapters 

 'Middle Passages: Mediating Classics and Radical Philology in Marlene Nourbese Philip and Derek Walcott', Classicisms in the Black Atlantic, edited by Ian Moyer, Adam Lecznar, and Heidi Morse (Oxford: Oxford University Press, 2020) pp. 29–56
'Thucydideses: Authorship, Anachrony, and Anachronism in Greek historiography', Classical Receptions Journal 12/1. Special Issue on Anachronism, 2020, pp. 32–45
‘Subaltern Classics in Anti- and Post-Colonial Literatures in English’, The Oxford History of Classical Reception in English Literature, vol. 5: 1880–2000, edited by Kenneth Haynes (Oxford: Oxford University Press, 2019) pp. 576–607
'Fictions of Dialogue in Thucydides', The End of Dialogue in Antiquity, edited by Simon Goldhill (Cambridge: Cambridge University Press, 2008)

References

External links 
Faculty page, Department of Classics, Yale University
Faculty page, Department of African-American Studies, Yale University

Living people
English classical scholars
Scholars of ancient Greek history
Alumni of the University of Cambridge
Yale University faculty
Place of birth missing (living people)
Year of birth missing (living people)
Nationality missing
Black studies scholars
Women classical scholars